Aurigny Air Services Limited (pronounced ), commonly known as Aurigny, is the flag carrier airline of the Bailiwick of Guernsey with its head office next to Guernsey Airport in the Channel Islands, and wholly owned by the States of Guernsey since nationalisation in 2003. It operates regular passenger and freight services to the Channel Islands, Republic of Ireland and the United Kingdom as well as seasonal services to France and Spain. Its main base is situated next to Guernsey Airport, with other aircraft and crew based at Alderney Airport. Aurigny is one of the longest serving regional airlines in the world, and is the second oldest established airline in Britain after Loganair. The origin of its name lies in the cognate across Norman languages for Alderney.

History

Early years

Aurigny Air Services was founded by Sir Derrick Bailey and started operations on 1 March 1968 after British United Airways withdrew from the Alderney to Guernsey route. It initially operated Britten-Norman Islander aircraft, developing a highly efficient network linking the Channel Islands with each other and with France and the United Kingdom. During the first year of operations, the airline carried 45,000 passengers between Guernsey, Jersey, and Alderney.

Aurigny became the first commercial operator of the Britten-Norman Trislander in July 1971; the airline remained the world's largest operator of the type until its retirement. Use of this larger aircraft enabled the route structure to be developed to include the south coast of England and northern France. In 1977, Aurigny banned smoking on all services, the first ever airline to do so. In 1979, it acquired Anglo Normandy Aviation, which was established in 1975. In 1993, Aurigny won a contract to carry mail between the Channel Islands and the UK and in 1999 it began daily services between Guernsey–London Stansted Airport and Amsterdam Airport operated by Saab 340 aircraft. The latter route was later dropped due to poor demand, but marked its transition from a local carrier to a regional airline.

Regional transition

Ownership of the airline passed from Aurigny Aviation Holdings to Close Brothers Private Equity on 23 May 2000, but was wholly acquired by States of Guernsey on 15 May 2003, after British Airways announced that it was to cease flying on the London Gatwick–Guernsey route (just two months before the Island Games). It employs 280 staff in the Channel Islands, France, and the United Kingdom. Aurigny also operates charter services, and is a handling agent for various other airlines which fly into Guernsey, including Blue Islands.

In June 2006, a survey by market researchers islandopinion.com showed that Aurigny was the most popular airline which served Guernsey. On 21 June 2007, Aurigny got permission from its sole shareholder, the States of Guernsey, to raise a private loan to purchase two new ATR 72-500 aircraft, which entered service in March 2009. Aurigny celebrated 40 years in operation in 2008. It was voted 4th-best short-haul airline in a poll published in the consumer magazine Which?. In a survey of 30,000 members the magazine examined 71 airlines and asked readers to rate each carrier for standards of check-in, cabin staff, cleanliness, food and entertainment.

In March 2009, the airline announced that it was to operate a Jersey – London Stansted route, whilst restarting the Guernsey and East Midlands link. Daily flights commenced from 1 May 2009. The frequency of flights from Guernsey – London Gatwick was increased from four to five daily return flights that day. In August 2009, Aurigny announced that it would be operating winter flights to Grenoble using its ATR 72-500 aircraft. The flights ran from 26 December 2009 to midway through February 2010. This was repeated for the 2010/2011 winter season, but flights were continued until March. The extension did not prove viable and the previous length of operation has been restored since the 2011/2012 season. Thanks to the change, it noted that demand was stronger due to a decreased period of availability.

Recent history

It was revealed in July 2010 that Blue Islands was planning to buy Aurigny, and was undergoing a due diligence process with the Treasury and Resources department of the States of Guernsey. This sparked major debate throughout the islands, and a Facebook page in opposition to the proposed buy-out gained 530 members. On 14 September, Treasury and Resources announced that the sale would not go ahead.

Blue Islands' withdrawal from Alderney on 9 May 2011 left Aurigny with a monopoly on that island for the first time in over a decade. However, it was criticised later that year for cutting the number of flights to Southampton, not lowering prices and reducing services to twice daily over that winter; Malcolm Hart later reaffirmed its commitment to the route and admitted that encouraging passengers to fly via Guernsey had been 'the biggest mistake in Aurigny's recent history'. At the end of 2011, Aurigny rolled out the first GPS approach system in Europe (based on the European Geostationary Navigation Overlay Service, for use by its Trislanders at Alderney and Southampton airports, in co-operation with EUROCONTROL, allowing flights in lower visibility and in poorer weather.

In October 2013, Mark Darby joined the company as CEO after six months as a non-executive director. He would initiate an eight-week trial for the Dornier 228 as a replacement for the Trislander fleet, on lease from Aero VIP (Portugal), and later the purchase of four such aircraft (two older and two NG variants). Three aircraft arrived during the course of 2014 and 2015, with another due from manufacturer RUAG in 2017.

After Flybe announced its withdrawal from the London Gatwick – Guernsey route by March 2014, Aurigny ordered an Embraer 195 to serve its Gatwick route in order to provide sufficient capacity as the sole operator. The aircraft was delivered on 24 June 2014, and a similar aircraft was wet leased from Flybe between March and June to provide capacity in the interim. Given substantial government investment in fleet acquisition, and its monopoly position on the Gatwick route, an agreement between the airline and the States of Guernsey struck in April 2014 saw it commit to offer 65% of fares for £65.00 or less. Additionally, in January 2014 Aurigny applied to the States of Guernsey to operate a Guernsey – London City service, with an aim of starting the route from May. Due to delays in aircraft procurement, the route commenced on 8 September 2014, initially operated by VLM Airlines.

After ten years of competition with Blue Islands on the Jersey – Guernsey inter-island route, in March 2014 Aurigny signed a codeshare agreement with that airline pertaining to Jersey – Guernsey inter-island services. The deal, which marked the cessation of Aurigny flights from Jersey for the first time since 1969, saw Blue Islands take over all flying on the route and Aurigny oversee ground-handling of Blue Islands flights in Guernsey. Each airline sold 50% of available seats, and the contract was initially signed for two years. In January 2016, Aurigny and Blue Islands announced the contract for the codeshare would not be renewed, after Blue Islands became a franchise partner with Flybe and restrictions on the latter's inter-island operation were lifted by the States of Guernsey the previous year.

In April 2015, Aurigny acquired an ATR 42-500 on dry lease from Nordic Aviation Capital for use on London City – Guernsey services, and as a back-up aircraft. In December of that year, Aurigny announced a new year-round route from Guernsey to Leeds Bradford (commencing 27 May 2016), and a summer seasonal service to Norwich (commencing 14 May 2016), using its ATR 42 and ATR 72 aircraft. In February 2016, Aurigny announced that it would operate a summer seasonal service from Guernsey to Barcelona, to be operated by its Embraer 195 over four weekends from 23 July to 13 August 2016. Additionally, it applied to operate a summer seasonal service between Guernsey and London Luton from March 2017.

In November 2015, the States of Guernsey agreed to recapitalise Aurigny's holding company, Cabernet Ltd, by paying off £25m of existing and expected debt. The airline signed a Memorandum of Understanding with the States of Guernsey and the States of Alderney, putting in place a system of communication between the three parties as well as a basic service level agreement, in February 2016.

Corporate affairs

Ownership and structure
Cabernet Ltd is the 100% holding company for the Aurigny Group, which consists of Aurigny Air Services and Anglo Normandy Aero Engineering.  The holding company is itself 100% owned by "The States of Guernsey acting by and through the States Trading Supervisory Board".

Business trends
The airline has been loss-making for a number of years; however its services have been viewed as essential to Guernsey's economy, etc. - a May 2017 strategic review said "that Aurigny’s objectives should focus on supporting economic enablement and providing a backbone of air services to support the Bailiwick [of Guernsey]’s economy and its growth, providing access to affordable air travel to the UK."

Trading figures have been released for Cabernet Ltd (that is, the Aurigny Group), with promises of increasing transparency. The key trends over recent years, from annual accounts and press statements, are shown below (as at year ending 31 December):

Criticism
On 9 June 2017, Aurigny withdrew the island's medevac service outside of normal hours, meaning Alderney residents could only be transferred to hospital during working hours. Outside of normal hours, medical transfers became the responsibility of the Royal National Lifeboat Institution. The airline blamed a lack of staff, and The States of Guernsey said it was trying to work with Aurigny to address the issue.

In February 2020, the President of the States of Alderney William Tate told a meeting of the UK Parliament's All-Parliamentary Channel Islands Group, "We have an airline which is state-owned and operated by Aurigny. It was started in Alderney 51 years ago and, without going into all the whys and wherefores, that service is unlikely to be provided in the future in the same way that it has been historically. So we’re going to be faced with a reduction in our capacity which will seriously damage our economic prospects. Half of the seats on the Southampton to Alderney service are filled by tourists. That service could well end. And anyone wishing to visit Alderney will have to visit via Guernsey. That’s a massive disincentive economically."

In April 2022 during the Easter Holiday season, several circumstances caused the Alderney service to be cancelled for at least two days. It was stated that one Dornier was out of action for routine maintenance and the second out of action as a part of the aircraft broke which according to Aurigny, had never occurred before. Strong backlash came from those who were booked on for the flights affected. Many were transferred via ferry to and from Guernsey. Alex Snowdon, an Alderney deputy blamed the 2 plane system for this occurrence saying "It is essential that new options are looked at and assessed because we cannot be served with just two small planes. Whether that be an increase in small planes, a different type of small planes or the Aurigny strategy over a longer runway, using the ATR which would give increased capacity." Aurigny states; "The Dornier are the correct aircraft for the route at this time."

Destinations

Destinations
As of December 2022, Aurigny serves the following destinations:

Codeshare and Interline agreements 
Aurigny has codeshare and interline agreements with the following airlines (as of July 2022):

 Blue Islands
 British Airways
 Eastern Airways
EasyJet
 Loganair

Fleet

Current fleet

As of April 2022, the Aurigny Air Services fleet consists of:

Historical fleet
The airline formerly operated the following aircraft types:
the ATR 42-500 (retired 2020), the ATR 72-500, 3 Dornier 228's (1 more was used for trials in 2013), the de Havilland Canada DHC-6 Twin Otter (retired by mid-1980s), the Short 360 (retired 2006) and the Saab 340 (retired early 2000s) as well as leasing a British Aerospace 146 (for summer 2003 charters) and a Boeing 737-300 from Titan Airways to stand in for unserviceable aircraft.

Aurigny announced in April 2014 that it would retire its five Trislanders and replace them with three second-hand Dornier 228s, noting that "the cost of keeping [the Trislanders] in the air is now prohibitively expensive". The programme to replace the Trislanders was expected to cost £3 million, with the airline asking the States of Guernsey for a loan in order to fund its Dornier acquisition.

Aurigny's flagship Trislander aircraft, nicknamed "Joey" after its registration G-JOEY, gained popular affection over time and a campaign was established to have it put on display in Guernsey rather than being sold. The aircraft made its final flight on 28 June 2015, and in November of that year it was announced that it would be preserved on the island. In March 2016 Oatlands Village, a local tourist attraction, was revealed to be Joey's probable new home, subject to permission for construction of a suitable building to house the Trislander. "Oaty & Joey's Playbarn" opened in January 2019 with G-JOEY suspended from the ceiling as a static exhibit.

References

Further reading

External links

 

Airlines of Guernsey
European Regions Airline Association
Airlines established in 1968
Transport in Alderney
1968 establishments in Guernsey